Tennis was first played in the United States in 1874. In 1881 the National Lawn Tennis Association was founded in order to organize all tennis activities in the country. The first major tennis tournament was called the US Open Championship and was also first played in 1881.

History

The first tennis clubs in the United States were formed in the mid-1870s. Mary Ewing Outerbridge allegedly introduced the sport to the United States after seeing tennis being played in Bermuda and demonstrated it to people on Staten Island in 1874. Soon tennis clubs were established across the country amongst the upper classes, including in New Orleans and San Francisco. The New Orleans Lawn Tennis Club was founded in December, 1876.

Althea Gibson was the first African American woman to win the US Open.

Governing Board

United States Tennis Association was national board for tennis in the United States. The organisation original name was the National Lawn Tennis Association this was changed to its current name in 1975. They are responsible for the promotion and development of tennis athletes in the United States.

US Open

The US Open is considered one of the 4 major Grand Slam tennis tournaments.

Popularity

Tennis is still a popular sport to watch on television in the United States.

Men's tennis

American male tennis players used to be amongst the best in the world and produced many Grand slam winners for much of the 20th century. The number of male tennis inside ATP rankings has declined since the 21st century.

Women's tennis

In 1887 the Philadelphia Cricket Club, hosted a National singles Championship. In 1888 a women's tennis tournament was soon set up.

The United States has produced many grand slam winners.

References